Nyuk may refer to:

 Lake Nyuk, a large freshwater lake in the Republic of Karelia
 Nazarene Youth United Kingdom, a United Kingdom youth organization of the Church of the Nazarene
 "Nyuk-nyuk-nyuk", an onomatopoetic rendering of the trademark laugh of Curly Howard of the Three Stooges